Reverse logistics encompasses all operations related to the upstream movement of products and materials. It is "the process of moving goods from their typical final destination for the purpose of capturing value, or proper disposal. Remanufacturing and refurbishing activities also may be included in the definition of reverse logistics." Growing green concerns and advancement of green supply chain management concepts and practices make it all the more relevant.  The number of publications on the topic of reverse logistics have increased significantly over the past two decades.  The first use of the term "reverse logistics" in a publication was by James R. Stock in a White Paper titled "Reverse Logistics," published by the Council of Logistics Management in 1992.  The concept was further refined in subsequent publications by Stock (1998) in another Council of Logistics Management book, titled Development and Implementation of Reverse Logistics Programs, and by Rogers and Tibben-Lembke (1999) in a book published by the Reverse Logistics Association titled Going Backwards:  Reverse Logistics Trends and Practices.  The reverse logistics process includes the management and the sale of surplus as well as returned equipment and machines from the hardware leasing business. Normally, logistics deal with events that bring the product towards the customer. In the case of reverse logistics, the resource goes at least one step back in the supply chain. For instance, goods move from the customer to the distributor or to the manufacturer.

When a manufacturer's product normally moves through the supply chain network, it is to reach the distributor or customer. Any process or management after the delivery of the product involves reverse logistics. If the product is defective, the customer would return the product. The manufacturing firm would then have to organise shipping of the defective product, testing the product, dismantling, repairing, recycling or disposing the product. The product would travel in reverse through the supply chain network in order to retain any use from the defective product. The logistics for such matters is reverse logistics.

Today, the global reverse logistic supply chain is valued at $415.20 billion and it is projected to reach over $600 billion by 2025.

Business implications
In today's marketplace, many retailers treat merchandise returns as individual, disjointed transactions. "The challenge for retailers and vendors is to process returns at a proficiency level that allows quick, efficient and cost-effective collection and return of merchandise. Customer requirements facilitate demand for a high standard of service that includes accuracy and timeliness. It’s the logistic company's responsibility to shorten the link from return origination to the time of resell." By following returns management best practices, retailers can achieve a returns process that addresses both the operational and customer retention issues associated with merchandise returns. Further, because of the connection between reverse logistics and customer retention, it has become a key component within Service Lifecycle Management (SLM), a business strategy aimed at retaining customers by bundling even more coordination of a company's services data together to achieve greater efficiency in its operations.

Reverse logistics is more than just returns management, it is "activities related to returns avoidance, gatekeeping, disposal and all other after-market supply chain issues". Returns management—increasingly being recognized as affecting competitive positioning—provides an important link between marketing and logistics. The broad nature of its cross-functional impact suggests that firms would benefit by improving internal integration efforts. In particular, a firm's ability to react to and plan for the influence of external factors on the returns management process is improved by such internal integration. In a firm's planning for returns, a primary factor is the remaining value of the material returning and how to recover that value. "Returned goods, or elements of the product, could even be returned to suppliers and supply chain partners for them to re-manufacture".

Third-party logistics providers see that up to 7% of an enterprise's gross sales are captured by return costs. Almost all reverse logistics contracts are customized to fit the size and type of company contracting. The 3PL's themselves realize 12% to 15% profits on this business.

An average of 8-10% of brick and mortar retail purchases are returned, compared to 20% of E-commerce purchases. In the USA alone, it is estimated that return deliveries will cost $550 billion in 2020. December is traditionally the busiest month for reverse logistics in the United States, with UPS processing over 1 million returned packages daily through Christmas. 

Reverse logistics research has also found that 84.6 percent of companies in the United States use secondary market and 70 percent see the secondary market as a "competitive advantage."

A Taiwanese research paper suggests three influential factors that drive the need for Reverse Logistics in businesses: Economic needs, Environmental needs, and Social needs. The study, who polled 12 environmental management expert from Taiwanese electronic firms, found that Economic needs are most important with an importance weight of 0.4842, followed by Environmental needs with an importance weight of 0.3728, while Social needs are relatively unimportant with a importance weight of 0.1430.

While the Economic need is caused by a company's desire to profit off of the recovery value such as in the US, the Taiwanese study reasons that the importance of Environmental needs is due to the concern for waste management shared by the developed countries such as the countries of the EU, Japan, and the US. For example, in the EU, there exists the "Waste Electronics and Electrical Equipment (WEEE) directive" which makes EU producers responsible for collection, treatment, recycling, and recovery of all WEEE, "Restriction of the Use of Certain Hazardous Substance in Electrical and Electronic Equipment directive" which restricts the use of toxic materials in electronics, and "Eco-design Requirements for Energy-using Products directive" which encourage the recycling of electronic products.

Return of unsold goods
In certain industries, goods are distributed to downstream members in the supply chain with the understanding that the goods may be returned for credit if they are not sold e.g., newspapers and magazines. This acts as an incentive for downstream members to carry more stock, because the risk of obsolescence is borne by the upstream supply chain members. However, there is also a distinct risk attached to this logistics concept. The downstream member in the supply chain might exploit the situation by ordering more stock than is required and returning large volumes. In this way, the downstream partner is able to offer high level of service without carrying the risks associated with large inventories. The supplier effectively finances the inventory for the downstream member. It is therefore important to analyze customers’ accounts for hidden costs.

Reusable packaging

Reusable packaging systems require a closed-loop logistics system.  Examples include reusable pallets, bulk boxes such as Euro containers, reusable bottles for milk, soda, and  beer, compressed gas cylinders, beer kegs, etc.

Refusal of the products in the cash on delivery (COD)
In case of e-commerce business, many websites offer the flexibility of cash on delivery (COD) to their customers. Sometimes customers refuse the product at the time of delivery, as there is no commitment to take the product. Then the logistics service provider follows the process of reverse logistics on the refused cargo. It is also known as Return to Origin (RTO). In this process, the e-commerce company adds the refused cargo to its inventory stock again, after proper quality checks per the company's rules.

References

External links
Glossary of the Reverse Logistics Executive Council

Supply chain management
Recycling
Waste management concepts